Several ships of the Chilean Navy have been named Cochrane or Almirante Cochrane after Thomas Cochrane (1775–1860), commander of the Chilean Navy during that country's war of independence against Spain

 , lead ship of her class of battery ships, launched in 1874, and scrapped in 1933
 , a Fletcher-class destroyer, the former USS Rooks (DD-804), commissioned into the Chilean Navy in 1962, and scrapped in 1983
 , a County-class destroyer, the former HMS Antrim (D18), acquired by the Chilean Navy in 1984, and decommissioned in 2006
 , a Type 23 frigate, the former HMS Norfolk (F230), commissioned into the Chilean Navy in 2006

Cochrane, Chilean ship